The 2014 Kildare Senior Hurling Championship was the 117th staging of the Kildare Senior Hurling Championship since its establishment by the Kildare County Board in 1888. The championship began on XXX and ended on 5 October 2014.

Celbridge were the defending champions, however, they failed to retain the title. Coill Dubh won the championship following a 3-11 to 0-16 defeat of Celbridge in the final.

Results

Semi-finals

Final

External links

 Kildare GAA fixtures and results

References

Kildare Senior Hurling Championship
Kildare Senior Hurling Championship